Koryo Celadon is a 1979 South Korean short documentary film directed by Paul Raimondi about Goryeo dynasty pottery. It was nominated for an Academy Award for Best Documentary Short. It documents the manufacturing process of celadon vessels by Living National Treasure Yu Geun-Hyeong.

References

External links

1979 films
1979 documentary films
1979 short films
American short documentary films
1970s short documentary films
Documentary films about the visual arts
Korean pottery
1970s English-language films
1970s American films